No. 3 Operational Training Unit (3OTU) was the Royal Australian Air Force's main seaplane training unit during World War II.

Formed by expanding the RAAF's Seaplane Training Flight in late 1942, 3OTU was located at RAAF Base Rathmines in New South Wales and was responsible for converting RAAF aircrew to aircraft such as the Catalina and Kingfisher. In addition, aircraft from 3OTU flew anti-submarine patrols off the coast of New South Wales.

3OTU was disbanded following the end of the war.

3
Military units and formations established in 1942
Military units and formations disestablished in 1946
1946 disestablishments in Australia